This is a list of cardinals from Switzerland, or of Swiss ancestry.

16th century
Matthäus Schiner (1511–1522)

19th century
Gaspard Mermillod (1890–1892)

20th century
Charles Journet (1965–1975)
Benno Gut (1967–1970)
Henri Schwery (1991–2021)
Gilberto Agustoni (1994–2017)

21st century
Georges Cottier (2003–2016)
Kurt Koch (2010–present)

Lists of cardinals by country
Cardinals
Cardinals